The Nonsuch 26 is a Canadian sailboat, that was designed by Mark Ellis and first built in 1982. It is one of the series of Nonsuch sailboats.

The Nonsuch 26 is a development of the larger, 1978-designed Nonsuch 30.

Production
The Nonsuch 26 design was built by Hinterhoeller Yachts in St. Catharines, Ontario, Canada, between 1982 and 1988.

Design

The Nonsuch 26 is a small recreational keelboat, built predominantly of fiberglass, with wood trim. It has a cat rig, an unstayed mast with a wishbone boom, a plumb stem, a vertical transom, an internally-mounted spade-type rudder controlled by a wheel and a fixed fin keel. It displaces  and carries  of ballast.

The design has a PHRF racing average handicap of 225 with a high of 238 and low of 213.

Operational history
In a review Michael McGoldrick wrote, "the Nonsuch 26 is much easier to sail short-handed than the average sailboat, and that it probably has as much interior room as many 30 footers".

See also
List of sailing boat types

Related development
Nonsuch 22

Similar sailboats
Beneteau First 26
Beneteau First 265
C&C 26
C&C 26 Wave
Contessa 26
Dawson 26
Discovery 7.9
Grampian 26
Herreshoff H-26
Hunter 26
Hunter 26.5
Hunter 260
Hunter 270
MacGregor 26
Mirage 26
Nash 26
Outlaw 26
Paceship PY 26
Pearson 26
Parker Dawson 26
Sandstream 26
Tanzer 26

References

External links

Keelboats
1980s sailboat type designs
Sailing yachts
Sailboat type designs by Mark Ellis
Sailboat types built by Hinterhoeller Yachts